M. J. Radhakrishnan (1957/1958 – 12 July 2019) was an Indian cinematographer working mainly in Malayalam films. He got National film award 2018 as best cinematographer for his work on Malayalam movie Oolu. He won Kerala State Award for Best Cinematography 7 times (the most), equal with Mankada Ravi Varma. Earlier he worked as a still photographer and then as an associate to cinematographer turned director Shaji N. Karun. His important works included Deshadanam (1996), Karunam (1999)  Naalu Pennungal (2007), Veettilekkulla Vazhi (2010) and Akasathinte Niram (Color of Sky; 2012). His films were screened at several prominent film festivals around the world including Cannes, Shanghai, Cairo, Montreal, Telluride, Jeonju, Toronto, Chicago, Rhode Island and Rotterdam. One of his works, Marana Simhasanam (English: "Throne of Death", French: "Le Trone de la mort", 1999), won Caméra d'Or (Golden Camera Award) in the Un Certain Regard section at the 1999 Cannes Film Festival. Another film Veyilmarangal (Trees under the sun) won Golden Goblet award for Outstanding Artistic achievement at Shanghai International Film Festival 2019.  He worked on over 117 feature films and several documentaries and worked with some of the prominent Indian filmmakers including Adoor Gopalakrishnan, Murali Nair, Shaji N. Karun, TV Chandran, Dr. Biju, Jayaraj and Renjith. He mostly worked on arthouse films and was known for his natural lighting styles. In a career spanning more than two decades, he worked with a number of young film makers, mostly in their maiden ventures. Film Kalamandalam Hyderali 2019, directed by Kiran G. Nath was his last completed work as director of photography.

Early life 
M. J. Radhakrishnan was born in Tholicode, Punalur located in Kollam district, Kerala. MJR was very passionate about photography in his teenage days.

Career 
M. J. Radhakrishnan began his career as a still photographer. He worked as a still photographer on some films for which Shaji N Karun was the cinematographer. Then he started working as an associate cinematographer under Shaji N Karun, who was a major influence in his life. His first independent work as a cinematographer was Maamalakalkkapurathu (1988), directed by Ali Akbar. Film Kalamandalam Hyderali 2019, directed by Kiran G. Nath was his last completed work as director of photography.

Selected filmography 
 1988 Mamalakalkkappurathu
 1996 Oru Neenda Yathra 
 1996 Desadanam 
 1997 Kaliyattam
 1997 Raajathanthram 
 1999 Marana Simhasanam 
 1999 Karunam 
 2001 Pattiyude Divasam 
 2001 Theerthadanam 
 2002 Kannaki 
 2003 Parinamam 
 2003 Ek Alag Mausam 
 2003 Sthithi 
 2004 The Journey
 2004 Koottu 
 2005 Makalkku 
 2006 Pulijanmam 
 2007 Thakarachenda 
 2007 Naalu Pennungal 
 2007 Ottakkayyan 
 2008 Gulmohar 
 2008 Oru Pennum Randaanum 
 2008 Thirakkatha 
 2008 Vilapangalkkappuram 
 2009 Samayam 
 2009 Dr. Patient 
 2009 Orkkuka Vallappozhum 
 2009 Kerala Cafe (segment "Happy Journey") 
 2009 Madhyavenal 
 2010 Nirakazhcha 
 2010  Punyam Aham  
 2010 Veettilekkulla Vazhi 
 2011 Orma Mathram 
 2011 Sengadal 
 2011 Akasathinte Niram 
 2013 Papilio Buddha 
 2014 Perariyathavar 
 2015 Birds With Large Wings 
 2015 Ottaal
 2016 Pinneyum
 2016 Kaadu Pookkunna Neram 
 2016 Shaanu
 2017 Painting Life
 2017   Viswasapoorvam Mansoor
 2018 Oolu
 2018 A for Apple
 2018 Appuvinte Sathyanweshanam
 2019 Netaji 
 2019  Veyilmarangal (Trees under the sun)
 2019  Makudi
 2019  Kalamandalam Hyderali
 2019  Ashtamudi Couples
 2019  A for Apple

Awards

Kerala State Film Awards
 1996: Kerala State Film Award for Best Photography - Deshadanam
 1999: Kerala State Film Award for Best Photography - Karunam
 2007: Kerala State Film Award for Best Photography - Adayalangal, Ottakkayyan
 2008: Kerala State Film Award for Best Photography - Bioscope
 2010: Kerala State Film Award for Best Photography - Veettilekkulla Vazhi
 2011: Kerala State Film Award for Best Photography - Akasathinte Niram
 2016: Kerala State Film Award for Best Photography - Kaadu Pookkunna Neram

National Film Awards
 2018: National Film Award for Best Cinematography - Olu

Kerala State Television Awards
 2014 : Best Cinematographer - Thamaranoolu

International awards 
2008:South Asian International Film Festival-Best Cinematographer - Bioscope
2011:Zanzibar International Film Festival-SIGNIS Award for Cinematography - Veettilekkulla Vazhi
2013:Oaxaca FilmFest-Global Feature Section- Outstanding achievement in Cinematography/Mención honorífica mejor fotografía - Papilio Buddha
2015:Kazan International Film Festival, Russia -Best Cinematographer - Perariyathavar
2016:Indian International film festival Queensland, Australia -Best Cinematographer - Valiya Chirakulla Pakshikal
2017:Indian International film festival Queensland, Australia -Best Cinematographer - Sound of Silence (2017 film)
2017: Cincinnati Indian International film festival, Ohio, USA -Best Cinematographer - Painting Life 2019

References

External links 
 
PRD, Govt. of Kerala: Awardees List

1950s births
2019 deaths
Year of birth missing
Kerala State Film Award winners
Malayalam film cinematographers
People from Kollam district
Cinematographers from Kerala
21st-century Indian photographers
Best Cinematography National Film Award winners